Wassenaar Arrangement Semi-automatic Rifles (commonly referred to as WASR-series rifles) are a line of rifles sold in the United States by Century International Arms. The rifles are manufactured in Romania by the Cugir Arms Factory and are a semi-automatic variant of the Pistol Mitralieră model 1963/1965, a Romanian licensed derivative of the Soviet AKM assault rifle. Century imports them and modifies them in order to comply with national legislation before sale to the general public via licensed traders. The WASR series takes its name from the 1996 Wassenaar Arrangement, a multilateral export control regime to monitor and limit the proliferation of certain conventional weapons and dual-use technologies.

Design and construction 

The rifles are semi-automatic firearms manufactured in Romania by the Cugir Arms Factory and based on the Pistol Mitralieră model 1963/1965 (PM md. 63/65), which in turn was patterned directly after the Soviet AKM, itself a modernized derivative of the AK-47.

They differ from other AK pattern rifles in using internally welded spacer plates to center the magazine rather than dimples to strengthen the receiver above the magazine well. The arrangements of the rivets on the receiver and front and rear trunnions are distinctive amongst AK derivatives. The rifles use stamped sheet metal receivers that were originally intended for single-stack magazines and feature hard chrome-lined barrels, side-mount scope rail and wooden stocks.

Modifications for the United States 
Once imported into the US, Century adapts the rifles to conform to national firearms regulations including Title 18, Chapter 44, of the United States Code. The regulations prohibit fully-automatic fire and limit the number of major  components that may originate from outside the U.S. Century Arms installs triggers, pistol grips, and stocks manufactured by TAPCO of Georgia.

Trigger slap  
Older WASR-series rifles commonly produced trigger slap, which is caused by the bolt slamming backward into the trigger assembly and causing significant pain to the shooter's trigger finger. Beginning in 2007, Century International Arms has installed the TAPCO Intrafuse AK G2 trigger group, eliminating the painful trigger slap problem. Rifles with this trigger group will have "TAPCO USA G2" stamped on the left side of the trigger. Some of these rifles may exhibit canted front sight blocks and gas tubes.

Variants

GP WASR-10
The GP (General Purpose) WASR-10 is a 7.62×39mm caliber semi-automatic rifle that has been offered since the end of the Federal assault weapons ban. Factory-original rifles only support single-stack, low-capacity magazines (10-rounds). After import, Century Arms offered WASR rifles modified to accept double-stack, standard-capacity magazines. Pistol grip and thumbhole stocks were both commonly fitted to WASR rifles.

After the sunset of the 1994 assault weapons ban, importers are allowed to equip WASR-10s with compensators, bayonet lugs, and folding stocks, thus making the WASR-10 a general purpose firearm.

GP WASR-10/63
The GP WASR-10/63 was built using the same newly-manufactured single-stack receiver and chrome-lined barrel as the GP WASR-10, and the two models are cosmetically similar. However, while the GP WASR-10 was made with new parts, all parts on the GP WASR-10/63 (other than the receiver and barrel) came from a former Romanian military rifle. The original year of manufacture can be seen engraved on the left side of the trunion (the trunion is visible where it protrudes through the receiver on the left side, near the front), along with the original rifle's serial number. Dates seem to range from the early 1960s to the 1980s. Most or all small metal parts are marked with the last few digits of the original serial number. As with other WASR models imported into the United States, Century Arms modified these rifles to accept normal 30-round magazines.

The pistol grip, trigger group, slant muzzle brake and gas piston were replaced with U.S.-made substitutes to comply with U.S. regulations.

WASR-22
The WASR-22 or AK-22 Trainer is a .22 Long Rifle, semi-automatic cadet rifle loosely based upon the AK-47 and manufactured in Romania by Cugir Arms Factory. Unlike the AK-47, it uses a simple blowback method of operation. As such, it has no gas system and the internal components have been modified accordingly. While designed to be a cadet rifle for basic firearms and marksmanship training for the Romanian Army, it was never used as such. Instead, it was sold on the civilian market, primarily in the United States in collaboration with Century International Arms. Because of its cheap ammo and low recoil, it is marketed as a “starter” or “trainer AK”. It is usually shipped with two 10-round magazines.

WASR-2
The WASR-2 is a semi-automatic rifle version of the PA md. 86, which was developed from the AK-74. Chambered in 5.45x39, the WASR-2 is visually similar to the WASR-10, but with the bayonet lug ground off and lack of a muzzle brake.

WASR-3
This commercial export version of the WASR is chambered in 5.56×45mm NATO (which can also safely fire the .223 Remington round). It usually comes in the same configuration as the WASR-2. These have known problems with jamming or failure to feed. This may be due to low quality magazines, or their followers. The WASR-3 was originally supplied with surplus 5.45×39mm AK-74 magazines, which do not reliably feed the 5.56/.223 cartridge. People have used Wieger magazines with some success. Century Arms eventually began including Romanian copies of the reliable Wieger magazine with these rifles. Some switch the follower of an AK-74 magazine with one from Robinson Arms. Israeli Galil steel magazines are also known to work without modification in the WASR-3. Some owners have also modified the rifle to accept Bulgarian Circle-10 5.56 magazines, or Polish Beryl 5.56 magazines. These sometimes require some material to be removed from the receiver center support bar.

WASR-M 
The WASR-M is a 2020 variant pistol caliber carbine. Utilizing a direct blowback mechanism, the WASR-M is chambered in 9mm Luger, and feeds from Glock pattern magazines.

Notable incidents 
A WASR-10 rifle was used in the following mass shootings:
 The 2007 Westroads Mall shooting in Omaha, Nebraska, killing nine (including the gunman) 
 A 2009 shooting of Pittsburgh police officers
 The 2011 White House shooting
 A terrorist attack at El Paso in 2019, killing 23
 The 2019 Gilroy Garlic Festival shooting, killing four (including the gunman) 

, the WASR-10 is frequently used by various Mexican cartels in the country's drug war. Between 2006 and 2011, the weapon was "the most common gun purchased in the United States ... to be traced to crimes in Mexico."

See also
 Saiga semi-automatic rifle
 Zastava PAP series

References

External links
American Rifleman review of Century's WASR-10
Roman-Forums.com - Romanian WASR-10 GP AK-47 Review
WASR-10.com - Information about the WASR-10 Romanian AKM

5.45×39mm firearms
5.56×45mm NATO semi-automatic rifles
7.62×39mm semi-automatic rifles
Kalashnikov derivatives
Rifles of Romania